The  Kittleson House  is located in Barneveld in Iowa County, Wisconsin. It was added to the National Register of Historic Places in 1986.

History
The building has been used as a domestic residence since built. It was recognized by the National Park Service with a listing on the National Register of Historic Places on September 29, 1986. The property is also listed in the State Historical Register since January 1, 1989

Architecture
From the NRHP designation: "The white clapboard Kittleson House is an American Foursquare, defined by its two-story cubical form and hipped roof. Each plane of the roof has a gabled
dormer with a small square window to light the attic. An element of Queen Anne influence is seen in the decorative shingle work used in each dormer. A broad hip roofed porch supported by
four round posts extends across the entire front facade. Beneath the porch, a shallow bay window is located to the right of the central door. A one-story enclosed porch protects the back entrance." The house was the product of an unknown architect.

References

External links

Buildings and structures in Iowa County, Wisconsin
National Register of Historic Places in Iowa County, Wisconsin